Methylcyclohexane (cyclohexylmethane) is an organic compound with the molecular formula is CH3C6H11. Classified as saturated hydrocarbon, it is a colourless liquid with a faint odor.  Methylcyclohexane is used as a solvent. It is mainly converted in naphtha reformers to toluene. Methylcyclohexane is also used in some correction fluids (such as White-Out) as a solvent.

Production and use
It can be also produced by hydrogenation of toluene:

CH3C6H5 + 3 H2 → CH3C6H11

Methylcyclohexane, as a component of a mixture, is usually dehydrogenated to toluene, which increases the octane rating of gasoline. 

It is also one of a host substances in jet fuel surrogate blends, e.g., for Jet A fuel.

Solvent
Methylcyclohexane is used as an organic solvent, with properties similar to related saturated hydrocarbons such as heptane. It is also a solvent in many types of correction fluids.

Structure
Methylcyclohexane is a monosubstituted cyclohexane because it has one branching via the attachment of one methyl group on one carbon of the cyclohexane ring. Like all cyclohexanes, it can interconvert rapidly between two chair conformers. The lowest energy form of this monosubstituted methylcyclohexane occurs when the methyl group occupies an equatorial rather than an axial position. This equilibrium is embodied in the concept of A value. In the axial position, the methyl group experiences steric crowding (steric strain) because of the presence of axial hydrogen atoms on the same side of the ring (known as the 1,3-diaxial interactions). There are two such interactions, with each pairwise methyl/hydrogen combination contributing approximately 7.61 kJ/mol of strain energy. The equatorial conformation experiences no such interaction, and so it is the energetically favored conformation.

Flammability and toxicity
Methylcyclohexane is flammable.

Furthermore, it is considered "very toxic to aquatic life". Note, while methylcyclohexane is a substructure of 4-methylcyclohexanemethanol (MCHM), it is distinct in its physical, chemical, and biological (ecologic, metabolic, and toxicologic) properties.

References 

Hydrocarbons
Hydrocarbon solvents
Cyclohexyl compounds